James Moran was a British boxer from Redditch, England. He achieved a gold medal for Boxing in the commonwealth games in Edinburgh 1986.

Boxing career
He represented England and won a gold medal in the 81 kg light-heavyweight division, at the 1986 Commonwealth Games in Edinburgh, Scotland.

Moran was from Redditch and boxed for the Austin ABC and won the prestigious ABA light-heavyweight championship in 1986. Moran also went on to win the heavyweight title in 1987.

References

Living people
British male boxers
Commonwealth Games medallists in boxing
Boxers at the 1986 Commonwealth Games
Commonwealth Games gold medallists for England
Sportspeople from Redditch
Light-heavyweight boxers
1963 births
Medallists at the 1986 Commonwealth Games